Josh Cook (born 15 June 1991) is a British racing driver currently competing in the British Touring Car Championship. He debuted in 2015, after being the runner-up in the Renault Clio Cup United Kingdom in 2014.

Racing career
Cook began his career in karting in 2003, before graduating to the SAXMAX Saloon Car Championship in 2007. He switched to the Renault Clio Cup United Kingdom for 2012, taking a two victories on his way to finishing fifth overall, with 287 points, and winning the Rookie Cup. He had previously done a partial season in 2010. He joined JHR Developments for the 2013 Renault Clio Cup United Kingdom season, ending the season fifth in the standings with five podiums. Cook went on to race for SV Racing in the 2014 Renault Clio Cup United Kingdom season, he ended the season second in the championship standings. In March 2015, it was announced that Cook would make his British Touring Car Championship debut with Power Maxed Racing driving a Chevrolet Cruze under the #RacingforHeroes banner He took his best finish today of 7th in race two, at Donington Park.

For his second season of BTCC racing, Josh joined the works MG Triple Eight Racing squad alongside rookie Ashley Sutton in the MG 6 GT. A strong start to the season resulted in resulted in P2 in qualifying at Donington Park to create an MG 1 - 2, a bad start for both MG's  allowed Matt Jackson to jump the pair but Josh managed to hold onto 2nd from the Toyota of Tom Ingram. After a slight mid season slum, Josh finished second in race 25 at Silverstone behind his teammate. However, after the race both MG's were disqualified for technical infringements. Josh bounced back at the final meeting of the season, by taking 3rd place on the last corner from Subaru's Jason Plato. Josh finished the season in 12th with 175 points.

Racing record

Complete British Touring Car Championship results
(key) (Races in bold indicate pole position – 1 point awarded just in first race; races in italics indicate fastest lap – 1 point awarded all races; * signifies that driver led race for at least one lap – 1 point given all races)

References

External links
 

1991 births
Living people
British Touring Car Championship drivers
English racing drivers
British racing drivers
24H Series drivers
Renault UK Clio Cup drivers
Ginetta GT4 Supercup drivers